Jim Stewart may refer to:

Australian rules footballers
Jim Stewart (footballer, born 1884) (1884–1951), played for St Kilda and Carlton  
Jim Stewart (footballer, born 1888) (1888–1939), played for St Kilda
Jim Stewart (footballer, born 1889) (1889–1964), played for South Melbourne
Jim Stewart (footballer, born 1917) (1917–1942), played for North Melbourne

Other sports
Jim Stewart (cricketer) (born 1934), former Welsh cricketer who played for Warwickshire
Jim Stewart (Scottish footballer) (born 1954), association football goalkeeper (Kilmarnock, Middlesbrough, Rangers, Scotland)
Jim Stewart (Queen's Park footballer), Scottish football right half
Jim Stewart (ice hockey) (born 1957), American ice hockey goaltender
Jim Stewart (rugby union) (born 1994), Australian rugby union player
J. I. M. Stewart (1906–1994), Scottish writer (often using pseudonym Michael Innes)
Crown Royal Presents The Jim Stewart 400, NASCAR Nextel Cup event named after an unrelated Jim Stewart

Others
Jim Stewart (politician) (born 1958), American politician and state legislator in Kentucky
Jim Stewart (record producer) (1930–2022), co-founder of Stax Records

See also
James Stewart (disambiguation)
Jimmy Stewart (disambiguation)
Jim Stuart (1919–1985), American football player